Karen Franciska Maria Louisa Damen ; (born 28 October 1974 in Wilrijk) is a Belgian singer, actress, host and one of the first members of girl group K3. She acted in a few movies and hosted a few programs.

Discography 

Studio albums (as a member of K3)
1999: Parels
2000: Alle Kleuren
2001: Tele Romeo
2002: Verliefd
2003: Oya Lele
2004: De Wereld Rond
2005: Kuma He
2006: Ya Ya Yipee
2007: Kusjes
2009: MaMaSé!
2011: Alice in wonderland
2012: Engeltjes
2013: Loko le

Solo Studio albums
2018: Een Ander Spoor

Filmography

External links 
 https://www.imdb.com/name/nm1495541/
http://subsites.studio100.be/k3/

1974 births
Living people
People from Wilrijk
Place of birth missing (living people)
K3 (band) members
21st-century Belgian women singers
21st-century Belgian singers